Robert II de la Marck (1468 – November 1536), Duke of Bouillon, Belgium, and  Seigneur of Sedan, France. Son of Robert I de la Marck and Jeanne de Saulcy.

Biography
Robert would fight against the supporters of John de Horne, Bishop of Liege, along with his own minor border engagements in the latter 15th century. He fought at the battle of Novara, saving the lives of his sons, was seriously wounded, taking two months to recover.

In 1518, Robert left French service after his company of lances was disbanded due to pillaging. He allied with Charles I of Spain, but later reconciled with Francis I of France. In 1521, he would place Virton under siege, thus instigating the Four Years War. During the war between Charles and Francis, Robert would be driven from his lands by Charles, which were restored following the Treaty of Madrid (1526).

Robert died in 1536 and was buried in the church of St. Laurence in Sedan.

Family
Robert married Catherine de Croÿ, daughter of Philip I of Croÿ-Chimay, Count of Chimay, in 1490.
They had:
Philippine, m. Renaud sieur de Brederode in 1521.
Robert III de La Marck, seigneur of Florange (d.1537)
Philip (d.1545)
Antoine
William seigneur de Jametz
John seigneur de Jametz
Jacques chevalier de l'ordre de Saint-Jean de Jérusalem
Jacqueline, nun

See also 
Château de Sedan

References

Sources

Belgian nobility

1468 births
1536 deaths